Cheryl Phillips is a data journalist and professor.

Career 
Between 2002 and 2014, she worked for the Seattle Times. In 2004, Phillips was part of a team that won the Sigma Delta Chi Award for their reporting on the TSA.  Phillips was on the team that gathered and organized the data for the Seattle Times when they were awarded two Pulitzer Prizes for Breaking News Reporting, one in 2010, for a story that covered the shooting deaths of four police officers, and the other in 2015 for their detailed coverage of the Steelhead Haven neighborhood landslide. While working at the Seattle Times, Phillips was the Data Innovation Editor at the time and contributed to the data gathering and data visualization that enhanced both of those stories.

Since 2014, Phillips has been teaching data journalism at Stanford University in the Department of Communication and Journalism, where she co-founded the Stanford Computational Journalism Lab. At Stanford, she is the Hearst Professional-in-Residence. In  2022, Cheryl Phillips became the  Director of the Stanford Computational Policy Lab.

References 

Year of birth missing (living people)
Living people
Data journalists
The Seattle Times people
Stanford University faculty
American women journalists